Karapatakis (feminine form: Karapataki) is a Greek-language surname that may refer to:

Andreas Karapatakis (born 1964), Cypriot sailor, competitor in the 1988 Summer Olympics (two person dinghy)
Angeliki Karapataki (born 1975), Greek water polo player, silver medallist in the 2004 Summer Olympics
Dimitrios Karapatakis (born 1947), Cypriot sailor, competitor in the 1980 Summer Olympics (Flying Dutchman event)
Marios Karapatakis (born 1951), Cypriot sailor, competitor in the 1980 Summer Olympics (Flying Dutchman event)

See also
 AEK Arena – Georgios Karapatakis

Greek-language surnames